This is a list of nations, as represented by National Olympic Committees (NOCs), that have participated in the Winter Olympic Games between 1924 and 2022. The Winter Olympic Games have been held every four years (once during each Olympiad) since 1924, except for the cancelled Games of 1940 and 1944, and in 1994 when the Winter Games were moved to the middle of the Olympiad, two years after the previous Games.

129 NOCs (118 of the current 206 NOCs and 11 obsolete NOCs) have participated in at least one Winter Games, and twelve nations (Austria, Canada, Finland, France, Great Britain, Hungary, Italy, Norway, Poland, Sweden, Switzerland, and the United States) have participated in all twenty-three Winter Games to date. Including continuity from Czechoslovakia, the Czech Republic and Slovakia have also been represented in every edition.

History

Origin and early Games
The first winter sport to be contested at the modern Olympic Games was figure skating at the 1908 Games in London. A total of 21 skaters from six countries (Argentina, Germany, Great Britain, Sweden, Russia, and the United States) competed in four events on 28–29 October.
Skating was not in the program of the 1912 Summer Olympics in Stockholm, but returned for the 1920 Games in Antwerp. Ice hockey was also part of the 1920 program of events, with seven teams competing.

The first Winter Games were held in 1924, in Chamonix, France. They were originally called International Winter Sports Week and held in association with the 1924 Summer Olympics, but were in retrospect designated by the International Olympic Committee (IOC) as the I Olympic Winter Games.
Sixteen nations participated in these Games: fourteen from Europe and two from North America.
Four years later, 25 nations were represented at the 1928 Winter Olympics, in St. Moritz, Switzerland, including Argentina (the first nation from the Southern Hemisphere), Japan (the first Asian nation), and Mexico.
The 1932 Games, held in Lake Placid, United States, saw the participation of 17 nations.
The 1936 Winter Games, in Garmisch-Partenkirchen, Germany, had 28 participating nations, the largest number to that date.
These would be the last Winter Games for twelve years, as the planned 1940 Games and 1944 Games were cancelled due to World War II.

Post-war years and Cold War era
After the war, 28 nations would return to St. Moritz for the 1948 Winter Olympics, but not Germany or Japan, who were not invited because of their roles in the war.
The 1952 Winter Games in Oslo, Norway, featured 30 participating nations.
The 1956 Games in Cortina d'Ampezzo, Italy, marked the Winter Games debut of the Soviet Union, along with 31 other nations.
The NOCs of East Germany and West Germany would be represented by a single German team, an arrangement that would continue until 1964.
Thirty nations would participate at the 1960 Winter Olympics in Squaw Valley, United States, including South Africa, the first African nation to participate in the Winter Games.
Thirty-six nations were represented in Innsbruck, Austria, in 1964.

The 1968 Winter Olympics in Grenoble, France, marked the first time that East Germany and West Germany competed as independent teams, two of the 37 nations that took part.
The Games of 1972 were held in Sapporo, Japan, the first time the Winter Games were held outside of Europe or North America. A total of 35 nations were represented, including the Philippines, the first appearance by a southeast Asian nation.
The Winter Games returned to Innsbruck, in 1976, with 37 participating nations.

Lake Placid was the site of the Winter Games in 1980, with 37 competing nations.
The People's Republic of China made their Olympic debut but, in response, the Republic of China boycotted the Games, protesting their inability to use the name "China" after the decision by the IOC. Sarajevo, SFR Yugoslavia was host to the 1984 Winter Olympics, which welcomed 49 nations.
Puerto Rico and the Virgin Islands were the first two Caribbean NOCs to compete in the Winter Games.
Several more tropical nations would participate at the 1988 Winter Olympics, in Calgary, Canada, including the famed Jamaica national bobsleigh team.

Recent Games
The post-Cold War events of the early 1990s led to a large increase in participating nations at the Olympics. At the 1992 Games, in Albertville, France, a total of 64 NOCs were represented, including a single Germany team—following the German reunification in 1990—and a Unified Team composed of six of the ex-republics of the Soviet Union.
The Baltic states competed independently for the first time since 1936, and some of the ex-Yugoslav nations started to compete independently in 1992.

In October 1986, the IOC had voted to hold the Olympic Winter Games halfway through the four-year Olympiad, rather than in the same year as the summer Games, and this change started with the XVIIth Olympic Winter Games in 1994 in Lillehammer, Norway. A total of 67 nations took part, including the Czech Republic and Slovakia as independent teams, and each of the ex-Soviet nations. Pakistan debuted in the Winter Olympics in 2010. Nigeria debuted in the Winter Olympics several years later, in 2018.

The Winter Games continued to grow in the recent past, with 72 nations at the 1998 Winter Olympics, in Nagano, Japan, 77 nations at the 2002 Winter Olympics, in Salt Lake City, United States, 80 nations at the 2006 Winter Olympics, in Turin, Italy, 82 nations at the 2010 Winter Olympics in Vancouver, Canada, 88 nations at the 2014 Winter Olympics in Sochi, Russia, and a record 93 nations at the 2018 Games.

List of nations

Description
This list includes 129 NOCs (118 of the current 206 NOCs and 11 obsolete NOCs), arranged alphabetically. The three-letter country code is also listed for each NOC. Since the 1960s, these codes have been frequently used by the IOC and each Games organizing committee to identify NOCs, such as within the official report of each Games. However, in this section, several countries which have long-form names designated by the United Nations are referred to by their common names, such as Laos (Lao People's Democratic Republic), North Korea (Democratic People's Republic of Korea), and Moldova (Republic of Moldova).

Several nations have changed during their Olympic history. Name changes due to geographical renaming are explained by footnotes after the nation's name, and other changes are explained by footnotes links within the table itself.

Obsolete nations
Obsolete nations are included in the table to more clearly illustrate past Olympic appearances for their successor nations.
TCH. Czechoslovakia (TCH) participated in 1924–1992, from 1994 represented by two successor NOCs of Czech Republic (CZE) and Slovakia (SVK).
EUA, FRG, GDR. For the Games of 1956–1964, Germany participated as a United Team of Germany (GER), representing the National Olympic Committees of both West Germany and East Germany. Retrospectively, the IOC uses the country code EUA for this team. After the NOC for the German Democratic Republic was granted full recognition by the IOC in 1968, East Germany (GDR) and West Germany (FRG) participated as two distinct teams at the Games of 1968–1988.
AHO. The NOC of the Netherlands Antilles (AHO) was recognized by the IOC from 1950 until 2011 upon the dissolution of the Netherlands Antilles.
URS, EUN, OAR/ROC. Soviet Union (URS) participated at the Games of 1956–1988. After the dissolution of the Soviet Union in 1991, nine of the fifteen ex-republics of the Soviet Union were represented at the 1992 Winter Olympics as a combined Unified Team (EUN). Since 1994 ex-republics of the Soviet Union are represented by fifteen successor NOCs, fourteen of which have participated in the Winter Games. At the 2018 and 2022 Winter Olympics, athletes from Russia competed as Olympic Athletes from Russia (OAR) and Russian Olympic Committee (ROC), respectively.
YUG, SCG. The Kingdom of Yugoslavia (officially the Kingdom of Serbs, Croats and Slovenes until 1929) participated as Yugoslavia (YUG) in three Games before the World War II. The Socialist Federal Republic of Yugoslavia also participated using the Yugoslavia designation, for all but one Games between 1948–1992, and hosted the 1984 Winter Olympics in Sarajevo. The Federal Republic of Yugoslavia (later the State Union of Serbia and Montenegro), consisting of the Republic of Serbia and the Republic of Montenegro, participated at the Games of 1998 and the Games of 2002 as Yugoslavia (YUG) and at the Games of 2006 as Serbia and Montenegro (SCG). Now the six ex-republics and one ex-province of the former Yugoslavia represented by seven successor NOCs, of which all have participated in the Winter Games.
COR. The Korea (COR) designates the united Korean women's ice hockey team at 2018 Games.

Table legend

Alphabetical list

Nations that have never competed
88 of the 206 active NOCs have yet to compete in a Winter Olympics.

Notes

Name changes notes

Participation notes

See also

 Tropical nations at the Winter Olympics
 List of participating nations at the Summer Olympic Games
 List of participating nations at the Winter Paralympic Games
 List of IOC country codes
 Lists of National Olympic Committees by continental association:
 Association of National Olympic Committees of Africa
 European Olympic Committees
 Oceania National Olympic Committees
 Olympic Council of Asia
 Pan American Sports Organization

References

External links
 Olympic Games. International Olympic Committee
 Olympic Review and Revue Olympique. library.la84.org
 Official Reports. library.la84.org

 
Participating Nations At The Winter Olympic Games